The Camp de Tir Olímpic de Mollet is a firing range located in Mollet del Vallès, Catalonia, Spain. Constructed between June 1990 and April 1992 and located near the Academy of the Police of Catalonia, it hosted the shooting and the shooting part of the modern pentathlon competitions for the 1992 Summer Olympics.

The competition area covered .

References
1992 Summer Olympics official report. Volume 2. pp. 293–7.

Sports venues completed in 1992
Venues of the 1992 Summer Olympics
Olympic modern pentathlon venues
Olympic shooting venues
Shooting ranges in Spain
Sports venues in Catalonia